XHMZL-FM is a radio station on 90.5 FM in Mazatlán, Sinaloa. It is owned by the Instituto Cultural de Occidente, a Catholic primary and secondary school in Mazatlán, and is known as Radio Cultura.

History
XHMZL took to the air on October 14, 1991. Originally permitted for 1 kW, it now broadcasts with 5.

XHMZL does not appear in the most recent IFT table release, dated March 31, 2016, likely because it failed to apply to transition to a social use concession.

References

Radio stations in Sinaloa
Mexican radio stations with expired concessions